Christopher Noel Hunter Lock (21 December 1894 – 27 March 1949) was a British aerodynamicist, after whom the Lock number is named.

Biography
Lock was born at Herschel House, Cambridge, the youngest son of John Bascombe Lock (18 March 1849 – 8 September 1921) who was bursar of Gonville and Caius College, Cambridge, and Emily née Baily. His brother was Robert Heath Lock. Lock was a Scholar at Charterhouse School, and in 1912 was awarded a Major Scholarship at Gonville and Caius College, where he was the only b* wrangler of 1917. He took his BA in 1917, won a Smith's Prize in 1919, and became a fellow of Caius College in 1920.

He was a member of the Anti-Aircraft Experimental Section, and in 1920 moved to the Aerodynamics Division of the National Physical Laboratory in Teddington, to work on the dynamics of shells. He conducted wide-ranging experiments, including on autogyros, and became an authority on airscrews. From 1939 until his death, he ran the Aerodynamics Division's High Speed Research Group. He developed the pitot-traverse method for measuring profile drag, and investigated the effect of sweepback at high Mach numbers.

He was a Fellow of the Royal Aeronautical Society and the Physical Society. He was a member of various committees of the Aeronautical Research Council.

Personal life
Lock married Lilian Mary née Gillman (1886/7–7 Oct 1966, aged 79) on 26 April 1924, at St Leonard's Church, Streatham. They had two sons, Robert Christopher (Robin) Lock (14 Aug 1925–19 March 1992) and John Michael Lock (25 Oct 1926–2 March 2002), who were both research students at Gonville & Caius.

References

External links

 Publications by C. N. H. Lock

Aerodynamicists
Ballistics experts
Fellows of Gonville and Caius College, Cambridge
1894 births
1949 deaths
People educated at Charterhouse School